Karen Gaffney is the president of the Karen Gaffney Foundation, a non-profit organization headquartered in Portland, Oregon "dedicated to championing the journey to full inclusion for people with Down Syndrome and other disabilities."

Biography 
Gaffney was born in California in 1977. She became the first person with Down syndrome to complete a relay swim of the English Channel in 2001. Her 2007 swim across the nine mile span of Lake Tahoe became the subject of the documentary Crossing Tahoe: A Swimmer's Dream. In 2009, she swam across Boston Harbor, a distance of five miles, to celebrate Down Syndrome Month in Massachusetts. She has also earned two gold medals from the Special Olympics, and completed 16 swims across San Francisco Bay, including the Escape from Alcatraz triathlon.  In 2010, she received the Global Down Syndrome Quincy Jones Exceptional Advocacy Award.

Karen Gaffney became the first living person with Down syndrome to receive an honorary doctorate degree when she received an honorary Doctor of Humane Letters degree from the University of Portland on May 5, 2013, for her work in raising awareness regarding the abilities of people who have Down syndrome.

Karen Gaffney graduated from St. Mary's Academy high school in Portland in 1997, and in 2001 she graduated from Portland Community College with an Associate of Science degree and a teacher's aide certificate.

References 

1977 births
American disabled sportspeople
Living people
People from Mountain View, California
Swimmers from Portland, Oregon
Sportspeople with Down syndrome
People with Down syndrome
American female swimmers
Portland Community College alumni
St. Mary's Academy (Portland, Oregon) alumni
21st-century American women